Look Back in Anger is a 2000 South Korean television series about two brothers' love for two women that aired on KBS2. Starring Joo Jin-mo, Lee Min-woo, Park Jin-hee and Bae Doona, the cast also includes the following actors pre-stardom: Kim Myung-min, Uhm Tae-woong, Kim Min-hee and Lee Eun-ju.

Cast
Joo Jin-mo as Lee Dong-hoon
Park Jin-hee as Shin Jung-hee
Kim Young-ae as Dong-hoon's mother
Bae Doona as Lee Mi-na
Lee Min-woo as Detective Lee Dong-jin 
Lee Eun-ju as Jung Soo-jin
Kim Myung-min as Kim Suk-gyu
Kil Yong-woo as Shin Sung-chul (Jung-hee's father)
Kang Seok-woo as Hwang Byung-ki
Oh Wook-chul as Detective Jo
Park Nam-hyun as Detective Go
Myung Kye-nam as Detective Lieutenant
Jung Dong-hwan as Detective Subsection Chief
Jeon Moo-song as Police Chief
Kim Min-hee as Lee Hye-jung
Park Jae-hoon as Bong Pil-doo
Yoon Yong-hyun as Han Sang-tae

References

External links
 (archived)
Look Back in Anger at KBS

2000 South Korean television series debuts
2000 South Korean television series endings
Korean Broadcasting System television dramas
Korean-language television shows
South Korean romance television series
South Korean action television series